Tomasz Adamiec (born 13 April 1982) is a Polish judoka.

Achievements

External links
 
 

1982 births
Living people
Polish male judoka
Judoka at the 2008 Summer Olympics
Judoka at the 2012 Summer Olympics
Olympic judoka of Poland
Sportspeople from Warsaw
21st-century Polish people